Sir Francis Neville Richards  (born 1945) is a former British civil servant and diplomat who was Governor and Commander-in-Chief of Gibraltar from 2003 to 2006, and the director of the Government Communications Headquarters from 1998 to 2003.

Career

Richards is the son of Sir Brooks Richards, who served in Gibraltar with the Special Operations Executive during the Second World War, and was later the Cabinet Office's Coordinator of Intelligence in the late 1970s. Francis Richards was educated at Eton and King's College, Cambridge and then commissioned into the Royal Green Jackets, serving with the United Nations Force in Cyprus.

After Richards' army career was cut short by injury, he entered the Diplomatic Service, serving in New Delhi and Namibia and holding a number of senior posts at the Foreign and Commonwealth Office. He was the first High Commissioner of the United Kingdom to Namibia.

He was director of the Government Communications Headquarters (GCHQ) in Cheltenham from 1998 to 2003. On his departure from GCHQ Richards said that the role was "... the best job I have ever had or ever expect to have... but you need to keep things fresh." Richards would later criticise Malcolm Rifkind, the chair of Parliament's Intelligence and Security Committee, saying that it was "not a very good idea" for a former Conservative minister to chair the committee. Richards also questioned whether Rifkind was "well-placed to command confidence." Richards was the chairman of the trustees of Bletchley Park from 2006 to 2011 and the chairman of the Imperial War Museum from December 2011.

Richards served as Governor and Commander-in-Chief of Gibraltar from 2003 to 2006.

At the end of his term in Gibraltar on 17 July 2006, Richards handed-over the keys to the fortress of Gibraltar, in the traditional 'Ceremony of the Keys', and departed on HMS Monmouth.  He was succeeded as governor in September 2006 by Lieutenant General Sir Robert Fulton, a former Commandant General Royal Marines.

An honorary senior fellow at the University of Birmingham, Richards was appointed director of its Centre for Studies in Security and Diplomacy in April 2007. He currently sits on the board of governors at Rendcomb College.

References

Further reading
 

 

|-
 

1945 births
Living people
Alumni of King's College, Cambridge
Commanders of the Royal Victorian Order
Deputy Lieutenants of Gloucestershire
Directors of the Government Communications Headquarters
Governors of Gibraltar
High Commissioners of the United Kingdom to Namibia
Knights Commander of the Order of St Michael and St George
Members of HM Diplomatic Service
People educated at Eton College
Royal Green Jackets officers
20th-century British diplomats